Jee Yong-Ju (Hangul: 지용주, Hanja: 地龍珠) (December 19, 1948 – August 25, 1985) was an amateur boxer from South Korea. He was born in Wonju, Gangwon-do, South Korea.

He competed for South Korea in the 1968 Summer Olympics held in Mexico City, Mexico in the light flyweight event where he finished in second place.

On August 20, 1985, Jee was stabbed in the stomach by his neighbor after an altercation in his home town, Wonju, and died due to excessive bleeding five days later.

1968 Olympic results
Below are the results of Jee Yong-ju of South Korea who competed in the light flyweight division of the 1968 Olympic boxing tournament in Mexico City:

 Round of 32: defeated Douglas Ogada (Uganada) by TKO - Rd. 2
 Round of 16: defeated Viktor Zaporozhets (Soviet Union) by decision, 3-2
 Quarterfinal: defeated Alberto Morales (Mexico) by decision, 3-2
 Semifinal: defeated Hubert Skrzypczak (Poland) by decision, 4-1
 Final: lost to Francisco Rodriguez (Venezuela) by decision, 2-3 (was awarded silver medal)

References

Jee Yong-Ju's profile at Sports Reference.com

1948 births
1985 deaths
Olympic boxers of South Korea
Olympic silver medalists for South Korea
Boxers at the 1968 Summer Olympics
People from Wonju
Olympic medalists in boxing
Asian Games medalists in boxing
Boxers at the 1970 Asian Games
Deaths by stabbing in South Korea
Male murder victims
Medalists at the 1970 Asian Games
South Korean murder victims
People murdered in South Korea
South Korean male boxers
Medalists at the 1968 Summer Olympics
Asian Games gold medalists for South Korea
Flyweight boxers
Sportspeople from Gangwon Province, South Korea
20th-century South Korean people